Ulidiopsis is a genus of picture-winged flies in the family Ulidiidae. There is at least one described species in Ulidiopsis, U. mirabilis.

References

Ulidiidae
Articles created by Qbugbot